MV Mefküre (often referred to as Mefkura) was a Turkish wooden-hulled motor schooner chartered to carry Jewish Holocaust refugees from Romania to Istanbul, sailing under the Turkish and Red Cross flags. On 5 August 1944 a Soviet submarine sank her in the Black Sea by shellfire, killing more than 300 refugees.

Final voyage and sinking
On 3 August 1944 three small old merchant ships, overcrowded with about 1,000 Jewish refugees, left the Romanian port of Constanța at about 20:30 hrs. Sailing instructions from the German naval authorities were for Morina with 308 passengers to sail first, followed by Bulbul with 390 people, and lastly by Mefküre with 320 refugees (the exact number may be slightly different) on board. The vessels were ordered to sail from position 43°43'N 29°08'E strictly southward, which would lead them directly into the Bosphorus. Armed ships of the Romanian Navy escorted the convoy and provided signal flags to aid their passage from the harbour and through the mined area of the approaches.

Mefküre failed to respond and carried on. "This bearing crossed the course of Mefkure and the two Turkish vessels almost exactly at the area where Mefkure was sunk during that night." The German historian Jürgen Rohwer claimed Shch-215 as the vessel which then attacked. Shch-215 fired 90 rounds from her 45-mm guns and 650 rounds from her 7.62 mm machine guns. Mefküre caught fire and sank. Her captain, Kazım Turan, and six of his crew escaped in the only available lifeboat, but only five of the refugees survived. The number of refugees killed is unknown, but one estimate suggests it includes 37 children.

On 30 July 1944 submarine Shch-215, under command of Captain 3rd Rank AI Strizhak, had departed from Batum, operating at the approaches off Burgas. This submarine, on the night of 5 August, claimed the sinking of a big schooner with about 200 armed men aboard, answering the attack with rifles and light machine guns, and in addition one "barkass", possibly a life boat. Shch-215 made the attack in position 42.00'N 28°42'E, at a distance of  westward from the ordered course of Mefküre.

A fortnight after the sinking a JTA news report alleged that three German surface craft had sunk Mefküre. The same report stated that Bulbul had been intercepted, too, but was allowed to proceed after identifying herself; at daybreak she rescued Mefküres survivors. Bulbul continued to İğneada, whence her 395 refugees and the five surviving Mefküre refugees continued by road and rail to Istanbul. Morina also reached Turkey, and refugees from both ships continued overland to Palestine.

Memorials
There are memorials to those killed aboard Mefküre at the Giurgiului Cemetery in the south of Bucharest in Romania and at Ashdod in Israel.

See also
Aliyah Bet
Patria disaster
Struma disaster

References

Further reading
 includes 19 documents and a list of 302 passengers (victims) of the Mefkure

External links

1929 ships
1944 in Romania
Aliyah
History of the Republic of Turkey
Jewish Romanian history
Maritime incidents in August 1944
Rescue of Jews during the Holocaust
Romania in World War II
World War II ships of Turkey
Ships sunk by Soviet submarines
Soviet Union–Turkey relations
Schooners
World War II shipwrecks in the Black Sea
Jewish immigrant ships
International Red Cross and Red Crescent Movement